Syria made its Paralympic Games debut at the 1992 Summer Paralympics in Barcelona, with two athletes: Ahmad Manfi in table tennis, and Ali Ismail in swimming. The country has participated in every subsequent edition of the Summer Paralympics, but has never entered the Winter Paralympics.

Syria won its first and so far only Paralympic medal when Rasha Alshikh took bronze in powerlifting at the 2008 Summer Paralympics, in the women's up to 67.5 kg category, lifting 117.5 kg.

Medal tallies

Medals by Summer Paralympics

Medals by summer sport

List of medallists

See also
 Syria at the Olympics

References

 
Paralympics